Afrikanda is a rural locality (an inhabited locality) in administrative jurisdiction of Polyarnye Zori Town with Jurisdictional Territory in Murmansk Oblast, Russia, located beyond the Arctic Circle on the Kola Peninsula at a height of  above sea level. Population: 1,644 (2010 Census).

History
The name of the station originated with the conversation of the railway engineers that worked on the nearby rail line. On an unusually hot day, they joked that the locality was "as hot as Africa", and half-jokingly called the future station "Afrikanda"—a name which has stuck.

Afrikanda used to be classified as an urban-type settlement but was demoted in status to that of a rural locality on January 1, 2005.

Transportation
Afrikanda is served by a minor railway station of the same name on the Kirov Railway, between Polyarnye Zori and Apatity.

Military
An air base of the same name is located just north of Afrikanda.

References

Notes

Sources

Rural localities in Murmansk Oblast
Polyarnye Zori
Former urban-type settlements of Murmansk Oblast